This list of educational institutions in Aarhus is a list of educational institutions in the city of Aarhus in Denmark. including primary, secondary and higher educational institutions.

Higher education 
 Aarhus University
 Aarhus School of Architecture
 Aarhus School of Marine and Technical Engineering
 Business Academy Aarhus
 Jutland Art Academy
 Royal Academy of Music, Aarhus/Aalborg
 School of Media and Journalism
 VIA University College, main headquarters plus Campus Aarhus C and Campus Aarhus N

Secondary education 
 Egaa Gymnasium
 Langkær Gymnasium og HF
 Marselisborg Gymnasium
 Risskov Gymnasium
 Viby Gymnasium
 VUC Aarhus
 Aarhus Katedralskole
 Aarhus Business College
 Århus Statsgymnasium
 Aarhus Academy

Vocational
 Aarhus Educational Centre for Agriculture
 SOSU Aarhus
 Aarhus Tech

Primary education  

 Bakkegårdskolen
 Bavnehøj Skole
 Beder Skole
 Elev Skole
 Ellekærskolen 
 Ellevangskolen
 Elsted Skole
 Engdalskolen
 Fjordsgades Skole
 Gammelgaardsskolen
 Hårup Skole
 Hasle Skole

 Højvangskolen
 Holme Skole
 Katrinebjergskolen
 Kragelundskolen
 Læssøesgades School
 Lisbjergskolen
 Lystrup Skole
 Malling Skole
 Mårslet Skole
 Møllevangskolen
 Næshøjskolen
 Risskov Skole

 Rosenvangskolen
 Rundhøjskolen
 Sabro-Korsvejskolen
 Samsøgades School
 Skåde Skole
 Skæring Skole
 Skjoldhøjskolen
 Skødstrup Skole
 Skovvangskolen
 Sødalskolen
 Solbjergskole
 Sølystskolen

 Søndervangskolen
 Strandskolen
 Tilst Skole
 Tovshøjskolen
 Tranbjergskolen
 Vestergårdsskolen
 Viby Skole
 Virupskolen
 Vorrevangskolen
 Åby Skole

Private and charter schools

 Børnenes Friskole
 Jakobskolen
 Selam Friskole
 Den Moderne Kulturelle Skole
 Laursens Realskole

 Skt. Knuds Skole
 Elise Smiths Skole	
 Lykkeskolen 
 Aarhus International School

 Egebakkeskolen
 N. Kochs Skole
 Aarhus Friskole
 Forældreskolen i Aarhus

 Nilen Privatskole
 Aarhus Privatskole
 Interskolen
 Rudolf Steiner-Skolen i Aarhus

Municipal specialty schools
 Heltidsundervisningen (HU) og Flexskolen	
 Langagerskolen
 Center 10
 Kaløvigskolen
 Stensagerskolen
 Sygehusundervisningen

Other
 Deaconal Folk High School
 KaosPilot

References 

Education in Aarhus